Nik Zaran (19 January 1933 – 3 January 2014) was a Vincentian actor.

Initially a keen sportsman, he mainly played football and cricket while attending the St. Vincent Grammar School. However, his dream was to become an actor. Aged 19 in 1952, Connell came to England, initially joining the Royal Air Force before going into acting training funded by the RAF.

Zaran began his career in 1961, firstly using his birth name before adopting Nik Zaran as his stage name in 1968. He appeared in many cult TV favourites including Danger Man, Man in a Suitcase, The Saint, The Champions, Doctor Who – The Space Pirates, Department S, The Troubleshooters, Randall and Hopkirk (Deceased) – The Trouble with Women, Jason King and It Ain't Half Hot Mum plus a few films notably the Blaxploitation flick Shaft in Africa. Other work included commercials for Frys Cocoa and British Overseas Airways Corporation (BOAC).

Returning to SVG in 1977 and reverting to his original name Tracy Connell, the actor concentrated on dance and theatre, tutoring several Vincentians to get into the business as well as setting up a theatre company, staging shows at the Peace Memorial Hall in Kingston including the phenomenal That Christmas Feeling in 1981, which Tracy wrote, produced and directed. He also acted as trainer on the Carnival Development Committee, training contestants and dancers expected to perform at beauty shows.

Filmography

References

External links 

Tracy Connell at Theattricalia

1933 births
2014 deaths
Saint Vincent and the Grenadines male actors
Saint Vincent and the Grenadines male television actors
Saint Vincent and the Grenadines theatre directors
Saint Vincent and the Grenadines dramatists and playwrights
People from Kingstown